Jake Smith may refer to:

Jake Smith (American football) (born 2001), American football player
Jake Smith (catcher) (born 1983), minor league baseball player
Jake Smith (pitcher, born 1887) (1887–1948), American baseball pitcher
Jake Smith (third baseman), American baseball player
Jake Smith (pitcher, born 1990), American baseball pitcher
Jake Smith (runner) (born 1998), British long-distance runner
Jake Smith (born 1974/1975), American country singer from Los Angeles, known as The White Buffalo

See also
 Jacob Smith (disambiguation)